Slit homolog 2 protein is a protein that in humans is encoded by the SLIT2 gene.

Interactions
SLIT2 has been shown to interact with Glypican 1.

References

Further reading

Slit proteins